Melody Zoë Klaver (born 9 September 1990) is a Dutch actress.

Early life and education
Klaver was born in Amsterdam, Netherlands and grew up in the suburb town Abcoude. She has two older sisters, presenter/actress Kimberley Klaver and dancer Stephanie Klaver. She finished her VWO (pre-university secondary education) on her high school 'Sint Nicolaas Lyceum' in 2008. She received her professional training (BFA in Acting) at the Maastricht Academy of Dramatic Arts, where she graduated in July 2014.. She also went to the Lucia Marthas Dansacademy from her 4th till the age of 15, from which she had to quit due to her busy acting schedule.

Career
When she was 15 years old she got nominated for a Golden Calf for Best Actress (Deep), which made her the youngest actress ever to be nominated for this award. She lost it to Carice Van Houten (Blackbook). Later she did win the Tudor Award for Best Actress (Deep) in Geneva and a Rembrandt Award for Best actress (Winter in wartime). In 2010 she got accepted by the Maastricht theatre academy and graduated 4 years later (BFA in acting). At the International Theatre school Festival 2014 in Amsterdam she won the Kemna Award for her role as Irina Arkadina in ‘The Seagull’ (Checkov) for best and most outstanding graduating actor/actress of the Netherlands and Belgium. Before and after her education Melody played (lead) roles in art-house films such as ‘Northern Light’ (Langer Licht) by David Lammers, ‘Deep’ (Diep) by Simone van Dusseldorp, ‘Dusk’ (Schemer) by Hanro Smitsman and in box-office hits such as ‘XTC just don't do it!’ (Afblijven!) by Maria Peters and ‘Winter in Wartime’ (Oorlogswinter) by award-winner Martin Koolhoven.
On television Melody was seen in the One-night-stand series film (50 min. films) ‘Once upon a Ladder’ by Eva Zanen, ‘Near Neighbours’ by Marleen Jonkman and in series like ‘Godforsaken’ (NPO) ‘Intoxicated’ (NPO) and playing super rich Pauline Bestevaer in ‘The Jackpot’ (de hoofdprijs) (SBS6). Melody is currently shooting the English-spoken shortfilm ‘The Whisk’ by Sanne Kortooms, in which she plays the Hungarian Daniëlla Fehér.

Awards 
 Tudor Award for Best Actress at the International Film festival Geneva for her role in "Deep" (Diep, 2005).
 Nomination for Best Actress at the Dutch FilmFestival for here role in "Deep" (Dutch equivalent of the Academy awards)
 Rembrandt Award (People's Choice award) for Best Actress, for her role in Winter in Wartime (Oorlogswinter, 2008).
 Kemna Award for best and most outstanding actor at the International Theatre school Festival in Amsterdam 2014.

Personal life
In June 2007, Klaver's boyfriend, Timo Smeehuijzen, was killed by a suicide attack during his military service in Afghanistan.

Filmography
Feature film:
 Deep (2005 feature film) - Heleen (lead)
 Northern Light (2006 feature film) - Kiki
 Afblijven (2006 feature film) - Debby
 Winter in Wartime (2008 feature film) - Erica van Beusekom
  (2010 feature film) - Frauk (lead)
 Near Neighbours (2010 TV-movie) - Felicity
 Brasserie Valentijn (2016 feature film) - Kelly
 Once upon a ladder (2016 TV-movie) - Jenny
 Silk Road (2017 feature film) - Agnes
 To catch a fly (2017 shortfilm) - Daniëlla Fehér (lead)
 Rafaël (2018)

Television:
 Roes (2008) - Rosanne (lead)
 The Jackpot (2009) - Pauline Bestevaer
 Van God Los (2012) - Rochelle (lead), episode Bitchfight
 Bagels & Bubbels (2015) - Shelly
 I know who you are (2018) - Charley Meurs

Theatre:
Played leading roles in theatreplays from Theater Utrecht, Bos Theaterproductions and De Tekstsmederij.

References

External links
 

Living people
Dutch child actresses
Dutch people of Swiss descent
Actresses from Amsterdam
1990 births
Golden Calf winners
21st-century Dutch actresses